Busengo is a settlement in the North Kivu Province of the Democratic Republic of the Congo. The town sits across the international border from Busengo, Uganda.

Location
Busengo is located only  (as the crow flies), east of Rutshuru,  the headquarters of Rutshuru Territory, in which this settlement lies. The geographical coordinates of the settlement of Busengo, Democratic Republic of the Congo are 01°09'37.0"S, 29°34'53.0"E (Latitude:-1.160278; Longitude:29.581389).

Overview

See also
 Beni
 Goma

References

External links
 Rutshuru, DRC: Attacks on civilians causes thousands to flee As at 13 February 2006.

Cities in the Great Rift Valley
Populated places in North Kivu
Democratic Republic of the Congo–Uganda border crossings